Dual specificity protein phosphatase 5 is an enzyme that in humans is encoded by the DUSP5 gene.

Function 

The protein encoded by this gene is a member of the dual specificity protein phosphatase subfamily.  These phosphatases inactivate their target kinases by dephosphorylating both the phosphoserine/threonine and phosphotyrosine residues.  They negatively regulate members of the mitogen-activated protein (MAP) kinase superfamily (MAPK/ERK, SAPK/JNK, p38), which are associated with cellular proliferation and differentiation.  Different members of the family of dual specificity phosphatases show distinct substrate specificities for various MAP kinases, different tissue distribution and subcellular localization, and different modes of inducibility of their expression by extracellular stimuli.  This gene product inactivates ERK1/2, is expressed in a variety of tissues with the highest levels in pancreas and brain, and is localized in the nucleus.

Model organisms
Model organisms have been used in the study of DUSP5 function. A conditional knockout mouse line called Dusp5tm1a(KOMP)Wtsi was generated at the Wellcome Trust Sanger Institute. Male and female animals underwent a standardized phenotypic screen to determine the effects of deletion. Additional screens performed: - In-depth immunological phenotyping

References

Further reading

External links 
 

EC 3.1.3